The Howrah–Sambalpur Superfast Express is an Express train belonging to East Coast Railway zone that runs between  and  in India. It is currently being operated with 22803/22804 train numbers on a weekly basis.

Service

The 22803/Howrah–Sambalpur Superfast Express has an average speed of 61 km/hr and covers 659 km in 10h 45m. 22804/Sambalpur–Howrah Superfast Express has an average speed of 60 km/hr and covers 659 km in 11h.

Route and halts 

The important halts of the train are:

Coach composition

The train has standard LCF rakes with max speed of 110 kmph. The train consists of 18 coaches:

 1 AC II Tier
 2 AC III Tier
 6 Sleeper coaches
 7 General
 2 Seating cum Luggage Rake

Traction

Both trains are hauled by a Santragachi Loco Shed-based WAP-4 or WAP-7 electric locomotive from Sambalpur to Howrah and vice versa.

Rake sharing

Train shares its rake with 18311/18312 Sambalpur–Varanasi Express.

See also 

 Howrah Junction railway station
 Sambalpur Junction railway station
 Sambalpur–Varanasi Express

Notes

External links 

 22803/Howrah–Sambalpur Superfast Express India Rail Info
 22804/Sambalpur–Howrah Superfast Express India Rail Info

References 

Rail transport in Howrah
Transport in Sambalpur
Express trains in India
Rail transport in Odisha
Rail transport in West Bengal
Railway services introduced in 2010